Tahsish-Kwois Provincial Park is a provincial park in British Columbia, Canada. Located west of Woss Lake, it is approximately 10,829 ha. in size.

References

Provincial parks of British Columbia
Northern Vancouver Island